Willy Venneman (born 26 February 1935) is a Belgian boxer. He competed in the men's heavyweight event at the 1960 Summer Olympics.

References

1935 births
Living people
Belgian male boxers
Olympic boxers of Belgium
Boxers at the 1960 Summer Olympics
Sportspeople from Antwerp
Heavyweight boxers